Incisitermes is a genus of termites in the family Kalotermitidae.

Species include:
 Incisitermes arizonensis (Snyder, 1926)
 Incisitermes banksi (Snyder, 1920)
 Incisitermes barretti (Gay, 1976) - barretti drywood termite
 Incisitermes emersoni (Light, 1933)
 Incisitermes fruticavus (Rust, 1979)
 Incisitermes furvus (Scheffrahn, 1994)
 Incisitermes immigrans (Snyder, 1922) - lowland tree termite
 Incisitermes inamurae (Oshima, 1912)
 Incisitermes marginipennis (Latreille, 1811)
 Incisitermes milleri (Emerson, 1943)
 Incisitermes minor (Hagen, 1858) - western drywood termite
 Incisitermes nigritus (Snyder, 1946)
 Incisitermes perparvus (Light, 1933)
 Incisitermes platycephalus (Light, 1933)
 Incisitermes schwarzi (Banks in Banks and Snyder, 1920)
 Incisitermes seeversi (Snyder and Emerson, 1949)
 Incisitermes snyderi (Light, 1933) - light southeastern drywood termite

References

Termite genera